Chris Roberts may refer to:
Chris Roberts (skateboarder), American skateboarder, action sports movie star, radio and television personality, founder of The Nine Club.
Chris Roberts (baseball) (born 1971), American baseball player and coach
Chris Roberts (chairman), ex-chairman of Torquay United Football Club
Chris Roberts (video game developer) (born 1968), American video game designer, programmer, film producer, and director
 Chris Roberts (pilot) (born 1945), British former test pilot, and Red Arrows pilot
Chris Roberts (singer) (1944–2017), German singer and actor
Paul Roberts (cricketer) (Christopher Paul Roberts, 1951–1977), English cricketer
Chris Ioan Roberts (born 1985), Australian actor

See also
Chris Douglas-Roberts (born 1987), American basketball player 
Chris Roberts-Antieau (born 1950), American artist